The 51st Karlovy Vary International Film Festival took place from 1 to 9 July 2016. The Crystal Globe was won by It's Not the Time of My Life, a Hungarian drama film directed by Szabolcs Hajdu. The second prize, the Special Jury Prize, was won by Zoology, a Russian drama film directed by Ivan I. Tverdovskiy.

Juries
The following people formed the juries of the festival: 
Main competition
 Maurizio Braucci (Italy)
 Eve Gabereau (United Kingdom)
 Martha Issová (Czech Republic)
 George Ovashvili (Georgia)
 Jay Van Hoy (USA)
Documentaries
 Sigrid Jonsson Dyekjær (Denmark)
 Hana Kulhánková (Czech Republic)
 Laurent Bécue-Renard (France)
East of the West
 Carmen Gray (United Kingdom)
 Tolga Karaçelik (Turkey)
 Mikuláš Novotný (Czech Republic)
 Agnieszka Smoczyńska (Poland)
 Yoshi Yatabe (Japan)

Official selection awards

The following feature films and people received the official selection awards:
 Crystal Globe (Grand Prix) - It's Not the Time of My Life (Ernelláék Farkasékná) by Szabolcs Hajdu (Hungary)
 Special Jury Prize - Zoology (Zoologiya) by Ivan I. Tverdovskiy (Russia, France, Germany)
 Best Director Award - Damjan Kozole for Nightlife (Nočno življenje) (Slovenia, Macedonia, Bosnia and Herzegovina)
 Best Actress Award - Zuzana Mauréry for her role in The Teacher (Učiteľka) (Slovak Republic, Czech Republic)
 Best Actor Award - Szabolcs Hajdu for his role in It's Not the Time of My Life (Ernelláék Farkaséknál) (Hungary)
 Special Jury Mention - By the Rails (Dincolo de calea ferata) by  Cătălin Mitulescu (Romania, Sweden) & The Wolf from Royal Vineyard Street (Vlk z Královských Vinohrad) by Jan Němec (Czech Republic, Slovak Republic, France)

Other statutory awards
Other statutory awards that were conferred at the festival:
 Best documentary film - LoveTrue by Alma Har'el (USA)
 Special Mention - Ama-San by Cláudia Varejão (Portugal, Switzerland, Japan)
 East of the West Award - House of Others (Skhvisi sakhli) by Rusudan Glurjidze (Georgia, Russia, Spain, Croatia)
 Special Jury Prize - The Days That Confused (Päevad, mis ajasid segadusse) by Triin Ruumet (Estonia)
 Forum of Independents Award - Tangerine by Sean Baker (USA)
 Crystal Globe for Outstanding Artistic Contribution to World Cinema - Willem Dafoe (USA)
 Festival President's Award - Jean Reno (France) & Charlie Kaufman (USA)
 Festival President's Award for Contribution to Czech Cinematography -Jiřina Bohdalová (Czech Republic)
 Právo Audience Award - Captain Fantastic by Matt Ross (USA)

Non-statutory awards
The following non-statutory awards were conferred at the festival:
 FIPRESCI International Critics Award:  (Gleißendes Glück) by Sven Taddicken (Germany)
 Ecumenical Jury Award: The Confessions (Le confessioni) by Roberto Andò (Italy, France)
 FEDEORA Award (East of the West section): Collector (Kollektor) by Alexei Krasovskiy (Russia) 
 Europa Cinemas Label:  (Gleißendes Glück) by Sven Taddicken (Germany)

References

2016 film awards
Karlovy Vary International Film Festival